Neelakuyil is a 2018 Indian Tamil-language soap opera starring Sathya, Snisha Chandran, and Chandhana Shetty. It was aired on Vijay TV from 17 December 2018 till 24 August 2019 for 211 episodes. The Show was produced by Ross Petals Entertainment. The series was the official remake of Bengali drama Ishti Kutum. It was an essence remake of Malayalam serial Neelakkuyil.

Synopsis
Chittu (Snisha Chandran), a simple tribal love-girl is cogently married to Jaisurya (Sathya), a young and intelligent journalist from the city. Surya had decided to marry Rani (Chandhana Shetty) after 7 long years of love affair. But the events that happened in forest just before their wedding engagement changed every thing. Surya is forced to marry Chittu, a tribal woman, when the villagers find them together in a hut on his visit to Poombarai forest. Unable to tell the truth, he brings Chittu home as a servant to help his ailing mother. However secrets revealed that Rani and Chittu are half sisters later on as story progress. The show ends with Rani sacrifices her love for Chittu's life reuniting with Jaisurya.

Cast

Main
 Sathya as Jaisurya (Surya)
 Chandhana Shetty as Rani (Surya's wife)
 Snisha Chandran as Chittu  (Rani's sister)

People around Surya
 Sabitha Nair as Kalyani (Surya's mother)
 Sathis as 'Captain' (Surya's uncle)
 Bhagyalakshmi  as Chandramathi (Surya's auntie)
 Gracy as Swathi (Surya's cousin)
 Vasanth Gopinath as Saravanan 
 Karishma Srinivasan as Jayanthi

People around Rani
 Rekha Ratheesh as Radhamani (Rani's mother)
 V.R. Thilagam as Sathyavathi (Sharath Chandran's mother)

People around Chittu (Tribals)
 Ruthu as Deivanai (Chittu's mother)
 P. R. Varalakshmi as Deivanai's mother
 Vaani as Sarojini (Surya's housekeeper)

Casting
Malayalam actress Snisha Chandran who appeared in Neelakkuyil was selected to reprise her role as the tribal girl. Sathya makes his Tamil serial debut as well as Telugu actress Chandhana Shetty.

References

External links
official website at Hotstar

Star Vijay original programming
2010s Tamil-language television series
Tamil-language romance television series
2018 Tamil-language television series debuts
Tamil-language television shows
2019 Tamil-language television series endings
Tamil-language television series based on Bengali-languages television series